Volker Prechtel (9 August 1941 – 7 August 1997) was a German actor. He appeared in more than 50 films and television shows between 1974 and 1997.

Filmography

References

External links

1941 births
1997 deaths
People from Füssen
German male film actors
German male television actors
Deaths from cancer in Germany
20th-century German male actors